Alexander Green (–1879) was an Australian executioner. He arrived in the colony of New South Wales in 1824 as a convict and became the colony's official executioner in 1828. His career as an executioner spanned over 25 years and carried out almost 500 executions, all but one of which were public.

Early life
Green was born in the Netherlands in about 1802, the son of a travelling circus performer. In 1824, he was convicted of theft at Shrewsbury for stealing "a piece of brown stuff from a shop" and sentenced to be transported to Australia.

Australia
Green arrived in Sydney as a convict on 12 July 1824 aboard Countess of Harcourt. He was initially lodged in the Hyde Park Barracks and worked for William Hutchison and Samuel Marsden under the system of convict assignment. He received a conditional pardon in May 1825 and his initial life sentence was commuted to a term of seven years. He subsequently worked as a scourger at Hyde Park Barracks and Sydney Gaol and as a labourer and honorary constable at Port Stephens.

Career as executioner
In January 1828, Green succeeded Harry Stain as the official executioner for the colony of New South Wales, having previously been Stain's assistant. He was employed on an initial salary of £15 14s 2d plus accommodation in the Sydney Gaol. This eventually increased to just over £60 per year.

Between 1828 and 1855, Green officiated at the executions of almost 490 people. The first years of his tenure coincided with strict enforcement of the Bloody Code; he hanged 170 people in less than four years under Ralph Darling and 183 people in six years under Richard Bourke, but under George Gipps only ten people in eight years. He frequent undertook multiple executions on the same date, including a group of eleven men in October 1828.

Notable prisoners executed by Green included ten bushrangers associated with the Bathurst rebellion in November 1830, thirteen Norfolk Island mutineers in September 1834, the perpetrators of the Myall Creek massacre in December 1838, convicted murderer John Knatchbull in February 1844, and Indigenous resistance leader Dundalli in January 1855.

Other activities
Green's reduced sentence expired in 1831. He moved into the Darlinghurst Gaol in 1841, where he lived on a small tenement. Green had several minor brushes with the law and had a prominent facial scar from a fight with an axe-wielding prisoner. In the later part of his career he was "in growing disfavour with the authorities for intoxication, insolence and mental instability".

In May 1855, he was committed to the Tarban Creek Lunatic Asylum by Edward Deas Thomson, the Colonial Secretary of New South Wales. He was observed at the Parramatta Lunatic Asylum in 1877, described as "86, and he looks about 500". It was said that "At one time this man used to amuse himself by hanging a number of dolls all day, but he is now past entertaining himself even in this genial manner".

Green died at the Parramatta Asylum in 1879.

References

Further reading

1802 births
1879 deaths
Executioners
Convicts transported to Australia
British people convicted of theft
People from Sydney
Dutch emigrants to England